Friedrich Julius Bieber (24 February 1873 in Vienna – 3 March 1924) was an Austrian anthropologist. He was known for his study of the Kaffa people of south-west Ethiopia.

References

1873 births
1924 deaths
Austrian anthropologists
Writers from Vienna
Anthropologists from the Austro-Hungarian Empire